Josh Vietti is an American violinist and composer from Los Angeles, California. On December 27, 2012, Vietti was named one of Los Angeles' Best Breakout Music Acts of 2012 by CBS Los Angeles for his unique talent and contributions to music education. Although generally billed as a hip-hop violinist, Vietti also incorporates country, gospel, pop, jazz and classical music styles into his repertoire. Josh is currently featured on ESPN's Sunday NFL Countdown commercial titled "The Journey". The commercial airs each Sunday throughout the NFL season. In the segment Vietti performs his own violin arrangement of the hip-hop classic In Da Club by rapper 50 Cent.

Early life
Vietti began playing the violin at the age of four. When he was seven, Vietti earned a violin scholarship with Mischa Lefkowitz of the Los Angeles Philharmonic. Vietti trained with Lefkowitz for ten years. In 2006, Vietti began street performing on the Third Street Promenade in Santa Monica, CA, reportedly selling nearly 50,000 demo CDs from the trunk of his car.

Career
Vietti has appeared on the Ellen DeGeneres Show, on celebrity wedding planner David Tutera's CELEBrations on WEtv  the Sway In The Morning Show on Sirius XM's Shade 45 in New York City, performed at the House of Blues' 20th anniversary recognition in West Hollywood. Vietti also opened for Roc Nation’s Bridget Kelly at the House of Blues in Cleveland, Ohio, for Z107.9′s Whose Got Next. Additionally, Vietti was interviewed by Colby Colb on Z107.9 and performed live on the Cleveland hip-hop station.

Vietti has opened for Grammy Award-winning artist Ne-Yo at the Michael Jordan Celebrity Invitational held at ARIA Resort & Casino in Las Vegas and for multi-Grammy-winners and Rock and Roll Hall of Fame inductees Earth, Wind & Fire at Nokia Live in Los Angeles, CA, for the 2012 International Pow Wow.;

Over the last two years Vietti has been on a college tour and has performed at over 200 universities nationwide. He is slated to perform for scores of additional institutions of higher learning when he hits the road again in 2014. He was also featured on Los Angeles's KTLA 5 News  for his performance at the House of Blues 20th Anniversary and on CBS 7 and FOX 28 News for his performance at Jefferson Community College in Watertown, New York.

Vietti was a featured performer at the 2012 Microsoft World Partner Conference at the Roy Thompson Hall in Toronto, Canada.

Vietti performed at Austin Fashion Week in 2011 and 2012, and at the Governor’s Mansion in Austin, Texas for a Formula 1 US Grand Prix event held in Austin and sponsored by Circuit of The Americas.

On March 7, 2013, Vietti performed on AXS.TV, a music channel owned jointly by Mark Cuban, CAA and Ryan Seacrest and backed by CBS. Vietti debuted his original song "Street Violin" and performed with guitarist Paul Freeman.

Vietti has performed at an NBA All-Star game and three times at Dodger Stadium. He first performed on the Reserve level plaza on the third base side on April 28, 2013, as a part of the Los Angeles Dodgers new entertainment initiative Viva Los Dodgers.  Vietti performed live in Dodger Stadium on May 14, 2013, in front of home plate for fifteen minutes preceding the National Anthem and was well received. Vietti also performed live at Dodger Stadium on September 28, 2014. He performed a fifteen-minute show preceding the National Anthem and then performed a ten-minute post game show. He was introduced by actor and stand-up comedian George Lopez.

Vietti was also a performer at the 2013 Gator Growl at the University of Florida in Gainesville, Florida in front of 20,000 students and alumni at the Ben Hill Griffin Stadium.<. Additionally, Vietti performed at the 2013 Festival at the Switchyard in Carrollton, Texas. He was an opening act on the main stage for bands Sugar Ray and Smash Mouth. Vietti also performed at the Centennial Festival at Ferrum College in Ferrum, Virginia on October 4, 2013.

Vietti performed at the Stone Soul Music Festival in Richmond, Virginia at the Richmond International Raceway on June 1, 2013. He was an opening act for American hip hop recording artist B.o.B., American rapper French Montana and American R&B singer Fantasia.

Josh Vietti kicked off his summer tour at the Whisky a Go Go on the Sunset Strip in West Hollywood on June 13, 2013. Vietti performed with LA-based Scratch DJ Academy instructor DJ 4TiFy. Vietti’s special engagement at the Whisky a Go Go was presented by Imaginarium Entertainment.<

References

External links
 Josh Vietti

Living people
American male violinists
American jazz composers
Country musicians from California
American gospel musicians
American jazz musicians
Musicians from Los Angeles
American pop musicians
American hip hop musicians
Jazz musicians from California
21st-century American violinists
American male jazz composers
21st-century American male musicians
Year of birth missing (living people)